Detroit City FC (DCFC) is an American professional soccer club based in Detroit, Michigan, that competes in the USL Championship. The club played in the National Premier Soccer League from 2012 to 2019 and the National Independent Soccer Association in 2020 and 2021. Detroit City plays its home matches at Keyworth Stadium in Hamtramck, an enclave of Detroit. The club is managed by Trevor James, a former Ipswich Town F.C. player who later was an assistant coach and scout under Bobby Robson.

The team's nickname is Le Rouge, derived from Detroit's French roots and the River Rouge that flows through Detroit and many of its suburbs. As well as fielding a men's professional team, Detroit City also fields a women's senior side in the USL W League, a development academy, and various youth teams throughout Metro Detroit.

History
Detroit City FC was started by a group of five Detroit residents who wanted a club of their own that would promote the city and help build community through soccer. In their first season in the National Premier Soccer League (NPSL), Detroit City FC finished second in the five team Great Lakes Conference of the Midwest Region. Le Rouge went on to lose 2–1 to AFC Cleveland in the Great Lakes Conference Semi-finals, ending their season with a 5–2–5 record. In December 2012, it was announced that head coach Kylie Stannard and associate coach Cale Wassermann would not be returning for a second season with the team due to other obligations. The following month, Ben Pirmann took over as head coach and Adil Salmoni was hired as associate head coach.

In 2013, Detroit City finished first in the Great Lakes Conference of the Midwest Region and was ranked #1 in the NPSL following an undefeated regular season and a Rust Belt Derby Championship. After beating rival AFC Cleveland for the third time that season in the semi-finals 3–1, DCFC lost to the Erie Admirals, ending the season with a 12–1–1 record.

The club went 8–3–3 in all competitions in 2014 and finished in second place in a newly aligned Great Lakes West Conference of the Midwest Region of the National Premier Soccer League, which is one of two fourth-division soccer leagues in the United States. Detroit City FC made its Lamar Hunt U.S. Open Cup debut on May 7, losing to RWB Adria in penalty kicks after a 2–2 draw. In the NPSL regular season, the club claimed the Rust Belt Derby trophy for its second-straight year. Additionally, the team extended its home winning streak to 15 games, with its last home loss being in July 2013. In attendance, the club reached its Cass Tech record of 3,884 supporters for its 3–1 win against the Michigan Stars on July 11, 2015. 

The 2016 pre-season began with the Keyworth investment drive, which raised $741,250 for restorations and renovations on Keyworth Stadium. On March 10, Detroit City began roster announcements confirming the return of the 2015 Black Arrow MVP Dave Edwardson. Detroit City played its first home game in Keyworth on May 20, 2016, drawing 1–1 against AFC Ann Arbor in front of a then-record 7,410 supporters. Detroit City also saw success in the US Open Cup beating the Michigan Bucks on penalties before falling to Louisville City FC, a professional USL side, also on penalties. The 2016 NPSL season proved less successful, failing to make it to the play-offs and finishing with a 4–4–4 record. In August 2016, Detroit City confirmed Ben Pirmann would return for a fifth season with the club.

After the launch of the 2017 season tickets, the club announced from Belfast that the club would face off against Glentoran F.C. in May to celebrate the fiftieth anniversary of the Detroit Cougars. Glentoran FC played in the United Soccer Association as the Detroit Cougars in the 1967 season when they went 3–6–3. Detroit City also had an international friendly against Venezia FC that they won 2–0. Despite starting the 2017 NPSL campaign with two points from three games, Detroit City went on a nine-game winning streak to finish second over-all in the Great Lakes Conference. The post-season included three wins, including a 3–2 win over first place Ann Arbor to win the Midwest Championship. Detroit ended its season in the NPSL national semi-finals with a loss on penalties against Midland-Odessa FC, from Texas, in front of a record crowd of 7,533.

Early in 2018, original founder Ben Steffans left the ownership group and was replaced by Mike Lasinski and Joe Richert, who was not outwardly announced or involved with running the club. Following the conclusion of the 2018 season, the club opened the Detroit City Fieldhouse in Detroit, Michigan. The Fieldhouse included a "clubhouse" bar as well as two indoor soccer fields for fans and the local residents of Detroit. It also houses the club's front office and training facilities. It was also announced that head coach, Ben Pirmann, was stepping down to join Memphis 901 FC as an assistant coach. His successor, Trevor James, was announced January 4, 2019.

Detroit City finished first in the Midwest-Great Lakes conference for the 2019 season and was knocked out in the region finals by Cleveland SC on penalties. On August 15, 2019, the National Independent Soccer Association announced that Detroit City FC would join the NISA for the 2020 season. On September 28, 2019, Detroit City FC announced that they would be adding a women's side in 2020, participating in United Women's Soccer (UWS). In the inaugural NPSL Members Cup, Detroit City came in first with an overall record of 8–1–1.

The 2020 seasons were complicated by the COVID-19 pandemic. The NISA 2019–20 Spring season was canceled after Detroit City had only played a single match and the 2020 UWS season was canceled in the months before kickoff. On June 19, 2020, Detroit City announced that they would host a UWS Stadium Showcase at the end of July. In the showcase, the Detroit City women would compete against Lansing United, Midwest United, and Livonia FC. Detroit won their first-ever home match 2–1 against Lansing, but lost to Midwest United 1–3 in the final. NISA announced on July 1, 2020, of an Independent Cup involving 15 teams in 4 regions. Detroit City FC would compete in the Great Lakes Division with former NPSL rivals FC Buffalo and Cleveland SC.

On July 30, 2020, the front office announced the sale of non-share "units" to fans and the public at large, allowing fan investment in the club, while the newly created Board of Managers would remain in control of decisions through Class A Membership. Originally announced to run through November 20, more than 2,000 supporters pledged over $1,000,000 in five days, putting the club at the limit for investment. On November 13, 2021, it was announced that Detroit City would join the USL Championship for the 2022 season, becoming the third NISA team to join the league after Miami FC and Oakland Roots SC.

Club culture

In the community
Since its beginning in 2012, Detroit City FC has been dedicated to supporting the city of Detroit and building community through its own partnerships and philanthropic missions, as noted in the club's motto, "Passion for our city. Passion for the game."

The club operates the Detroit City Futbol League, a recreational, community-driven adult soccer league in the summer. In 2014, the team announced its first fall recreational adult league, Soktoberfest. Detroit City FC also works with Think Detroit PAL to operate free youth soccer clinics and provide free admission to Detroit PAL participants.

Each season, one regular-season home game is dedicated as a fundraiser for a Detroit-area charity. On May 26, 2013, the club's match against Zanesville Athletic benefited the Wounded Warrior Project and Hooligans for Heroes, a nonprofit started by members of the Northern Guard Supporters. On June 6, 2014, the club became the first American sports team to wear a uniform in support of LGBTQ inclusion in a regulation match. Le Rouge dedicated the June 6 match versus Erie Admirals S.C. to inclusivity in sports, auctioning off the commemorative jerseys to benefit the Ruth Ellis Center, a Highland Park, MI., shelter for at-risk, runaway and homeless LGBTQ youth. For the 2015 season, City donned their alternate kits to support Think Detroit PAL, auctioning the game-worn kits to support youth league soccer in the city. On June 9, 2016, it was announced that the June 25 game against Dayton Dynamo would be their annual charity match, supporting Freedom House Detroit, a non-profit supporting refugees seeking asylum in the United States and Canada.

In 2014, the club announced its partnership with United Way of Southeastern Michigan to support its "Michigan No Kid Hungry" initiative and promote healthy lifestyles for youth in Detroit. On September 7, 2014, City hosted its inaugural Detroit Public Schools Showcase, which featured a friendly match for City followed by a regulation match between Cass Tech High School and Detroit Renaissance High School, with proceeds from the night going toward the boys soccer programs. The club has strong ties with Cass Tech High School, investing thousands of dollars into improving the Cass Tech field, a benefit to both the soccer and football programs. City also presented the Cass Tech girls soccer program with new uniforms early in the 2014 season.

Supporters

Detroit City has several supporter groups, with the largest and most notable being the Northern Guard Supporters. The supporter culture among all groups is very politically left-leaning. Banners and flags supporting various traditionally left-wing causes/issues can be seen throughout the stadium. Supporters support various social causes in the community such as LGBTQ+ issues, access to water resources, as well as other causes.

Rivalries

Prior to the break-up of the NPSL Midwest-Great Lakes conference, supporters of Detroit City FC, FC Buffalo, and AFC Cleveland formed the 'Rust Belt Derby'. The winner of the Derby was based on the head-to-head record of the clubs during regular season NPSL matches. These were typically high pressure games and particular fan favorites, especially by Detroit City FC supporter groups who have been known to greatly antagonize DCFC's opponents.  Cleveland won the inaugural Rust Belt Derby on June 23, 2012, following a 1–1 draw with Detroit. Detroit City FC would come back and win the 2013 Rust Belt Derby trophy after beating FC Buffalo 2–1. The 2014 trophy went to Detroit on goal differential after all three teams finished with a win and a loss in Derby play, and Detroit would win again in 2015 after a 1–1 draw in the FC Buffalo-AFC Cleveland Derby match that Buffalo needed to win by more than a goal to take the trophy. The last Derby was in 2016 after the Great Lakes conference was split into East and West. FC Buffalo and Detroit City FC contested the derby without AFC Cleveland through home and away friendlies.

AFC Ann Arbor was another rival of Detroit City prior to the two clubs leaving the NPSL and joining the USL League Two and NISA respectively. The history and proximity of the two cities cause their clashes to be important to supporters. In 2017, Ann Arbor won the Midwest Conference Regular Season title over City, who finished in second. Both teams qualified for the NPSL playoffs. The two teams faced each other again in the playoffs, with the Midwest Region title on the line. City defeated 10-man Ann Arbor 3–2 to ensure their passage into the NPSL Semifinals.

A cross-league rivalry has developed with the Flint City Bucks (formerly the Michigan Bucks), the other major 4th Division team in Metro-Detroit. The two faced off in the Opening Round of the U.S. Open Cup in 2015, 2016, and 2018, with the Bucks winning the first meeting 3–0 and City taking the second two meetings in penalties (0–0, 4–3 PK) in 2016 and (1–1, 5–4 PK) in 2018. The two sides met for a friendly on May 4, 2019. Flint City won the match 1–0.

In addition, Detroit City supporters have demonstrated a proud and passionate antipathy for the U.S. professional soccer system, particularly Major League Soccer, who has long targeted Detroit for expansion. City have generally played well against MLS opposition, including a 2−0 victory over Columbus Crew in the 2022 U.S. Open Cup.

With the announcement of a women's team joining the United Women's Soccer in 2020, Detroit City would be rejoining previous rivals AFC Ann Arbor and Lansing United.

Team image

Kit
Detroit City FC home kits are predominantly a dark shade of red or maroon, referred to as "rouge" as a reference to the club's nickname. Away kits are most often white, though champagne kits have also been worn, most recently in 2021. In 2019 Detroit issued its first set of third kits, which were black. Starting in 2013 and each season afterwards, the club releases an extra kit design as a "charity kit". These kits are then auctioned off at the end of a specified match to raise funds for a local Detroit charity. In 2020 there was no charity kit given the much shorter schedule due to the COVID-19 pandemic.

Sponsorship

Players and staff

Current roster

Head coaches
 Men's:  Trevor James
 Women's:  David Dwaihy

Board of Managers
  Sean Mann – CEO
  Todd Kropp – COO
  Alex Wright
  David Dwaihy
  Mike Lasinski

MVP recipients

At the conclusion of each season fans get to vote for the team's most valuable players, the Black Arrow Award. The title of the trophy is taken from the nickname of Gil Heron, a Jamaican born footballer who lived in Detroit and who later became the first-ever black player for Celtic F.C.

Black Arrow Award (Men's)
2012:  Keith Lough and  Josh Rogers
2013:  Zach Myers
2014:  Cyrus Saydee
2015:  David Edwardson
2016:  Tommy Catalano
2017:  Tyrone Mondi
2018:  Stephen Carroll
2019:  Shawn Lawson
2020:  Tendai Jirira
2021:  Connor Rutz
2022:  Nate Steinwascher

Black Arrow Award (Women's)
2020:  Sydney Blomquist
2021:  Madison Duncan
2022:  Shannon McCarthy

Honors

Domestic
National Independent Soccer Association
Season Championship
Champions (2): 2020–21, 2021
Fall Championship
Champions (1): 2020
Legends Cup
Champions (1): 2021
NISA Indepenent Cup
Great Lakes Region
Champions (2): 2020, 2021

National Premier Soccer League
Midwest Region
Champions (1): 2017
Great Lakes Conferences
Champions (2): 2013, 2019
Members Cup
Champions (1): 2019

Rivalries
Rust Belt Derby
Champions (6): 2013, 2014, 2015, 2016, 2020, 2021

Statistics

Year-by-year

Tournaments

Yearly attendance

Source

Record attendances
 Cass Technical High School Stadium: 3,884 (July 11, 2015, vs. Michigan Stars)
 Keyworth Stadium: 7,887 (July 31, 2018, vs. Frosinone Calcio)

International exhibition

Starting in 2016, after the move to Keyworth, Detroit City began a yearly tradition to invite at least one international club for a friendly per year. This excludes Windsor TFC, which is based just miles away in neighboring Windsor and has been played yearly since the club's first season. These invitations are often extended to a club that has a similar ethos to Detroit City, or holds historical significance to the city of Detroit. The 2018 match against Serie A side Frosinone Calcio set a new club attendance record of 7,887. In 2019, after announcing that the club was to play Lobos BUAP of Mexico, Lobos faced financial trouble and was replaced both in the Liga MX and the friendly with FC Juárez.

References

External links
 

C
Soccer clubs in Michigan
2012 establishments in Michigan
Association football clubs established in 2012
Hamtramck, Michigan
USL Championship teams